Shawn Murphy,  (born July 27, 1951) is a Canadian politician.

Born in Charlottetown, Prince Edward Island, Murphy attended the University of Prince Edward Island, and later the University of New Brunswick Faculty of Law, graduating with a law degree in 1976. He returned to Prince Edward Island and joined a local law practice, working alongside future Premier Joe Ghiz. In 1997, he was made a Queen's Counsel.  Murphy is married and has three adult children: Kevin, Paul, and Brian.

Murphy was a member of the Liberal Party of Canada in the House of Commons of Canada, representing the riding of Charlottetown since the election of 2000.  During the Martin government, he served as Parliamentary Secretary to the Minister of Fisheries and Oceans with special emphasis on the Oceans Action Plan.

He was re-elected with nearly 50% of the vote in the 2004 federal election.
Despite rumours of his vulnerability in the 2006 federal election, Murphy was reelected with slightly more than 50% of the vote. With the Liberals now in opposition, Murphy became the chairman of the Public Accounts Committee.  Murphy was re-elected in the 2008 federal election, again winning by a comfortable margin. He announced on October 13, 2010 that he would not be running in the next election.

Electoral record

Notes

External links
 

1951 births
Liberal Party of Canada MPs
Living people
Members of the House of Commons of Canada from Prince Edward Island
Members of the King's Privy Council for Canada
People from Charlottetown
Lawyers in Prince Edward Island
Canadian King's Counsel
University of New Brunswick Faculty of Law alumni
21st-century Canadian politicians